An extracorporeal is a medical procedure which is performed outside the body. Extracorporeal devices are the artificial organs that remain outside the body while treating a patient. Extracorporeal devices are useful in hemodialysis and cardiac surgery.

Circulatory procedures
A procedure in which blood is taken from a patient's circulation to have a process applied to it before it is returned to the circulation. All of the apparatus carrying the blood outside the body is termed the extracorporeal circuit.
 Apheresis
 Autotransfusion
 Hemodialysis
 Hemofiltration
 Plasmapheresis
 Extracorporeal carbon dioxide removal
 Extracorporeal cardiopulmonary resuscitation
 Extracorporeal membrane oxygenation (ECMO)
 Cardiopulmonary bypass during open heart surgery.

Other procedures
Extracorporeal shockwave lithotripsy (ESWL), which is unrelated to other extracorporeal therapies, in that the device used to break up the kidney stones is held completely outside the body, whilst the lithotripsy itself occurs inside the body.

Extracorporeal radiotherapy, where a large bone with a tumour is removed and given a dose far exceeding what would otherwise be safe to give to a patient.

See also 
 Intracorporeal

References

Further reading

External links

 Extracorporeal Circulation. MedicalGlossary.org

Medical terminology